Ballyfermot Bears RLFC are a rugby league club playing in Ballyfermot in Dublin. They play in IRL Leinster Division. They play in Markievicz Park, in Ballyfermot, a suburb located outside Dublin city.

Their local rivals are Tallaght RLFC, who also play in the same division.

History
Ballyfermot Bears were formed in 2010 after the dissolution the Dublin Destroyers RLFC. In the last three seasons the Bears have competed in the Leinster League playing in Markievicz Park Ballyfermot.

2022 squad

2012 squad

2013 squad

References

External links

Irish rugby league teams
Rugby clubs established in 2010
2010 establishments in Ireland